Song Hai-rim (Korean:	송해림; born January 12, 1985, in Seoul), also spelled as Song Hae-rim, is a South Korean handball player who competed at the 2008 Summer Olympics.

In 2008, she won a bronze medal with the South Korean team.

External links
The Official Website of the Beijing 2008 Olympic Games
 Olympic Sport

Living people
1985 births
South Korean female handball players
Handball players at the 2008 Summer Olympics
Olympic handball players of South Korea
Olympic bronze medalists for South Korea
Olympic medalists in handball
Medalists at the 2008 Summer Olympics
Handball players at the 2018 Asian Games
Asian Games gold medalists for South Korea
Asian Games medalists in handball
Medalists at the 2018 Asian Games
21st-century South Korean women